The Hoogovens Wijk aan Zee Steel Chess Tournament 1984 was the 46th edition of the Wijk aan Zee Chess Tournament. It was held in Wijk aan Zee in January 1984. The tournament was won by Alexander Beliavsky and Viktor Korchnoi.

{| class="wikitable" style="text-align: center;"
|+ 46th Hoogovens tournament, group A, January 1984, Wijk aan Zee, Netherlands, Category XIII (2557)
! !! Player !! Rating !! 1 !! 2 !! 3 !! 4 !! 5 !! 6 !! 7 !! 8 !! 9 !! 10 !! 11 !! 12 !! 13 !! 14 !! Total !! TPR !! Place
|-
|-style="background:#ccffcc;"
| 1 || align="left"| || 2565 ||  || ½ || 1 || ½ || ½ || ½ || ½ || 1 || 1 || 1 || 1 || ½ || 1 || 1 || 10 || 2767 || 1–2
|-
|-style="background:#ccffcc;"
| 2 || align="left"| || 2635 || ½ ||  || 1 || ½ || ½ || ½ || ½ || 1 || 1 || 1 || ½ || 1 || 1 || 1 || 10 || 2762 || 1–2
|-
| 3 || align="left" | || 2570 || 0 || 0 ||  || 1 || ½ || ½ || 1 || 0 || ½ || ½ || 1 || 1 || ½ || 1 || 7½ || 2613 || 3
|-
| 4 || align="left" | || 2630 || ½ || ½ || 0 ||  || ½ || ½ || ½ || ½ || ½ || ½ || ½ || 1 || 1 || ½ || 7 || 2580 || 4
|-
| 5 || align="left" | || 2570 || ½ || ½ || ½ || ½ ||  || ½ || ½ || 1 || ½ || 0 || ½ || ½ || ½ || ½ || 6½ || 2556 || 5–9
|-
| 6 || align="left" | || 2620 || ½ || ½ || ½ || ½ || ½ ||  || 1 || 0 || 0 || ½ || 0 || ½ || 1 || 1 || 6½ || 2552 || 5–9
|-
| 7 || align="left" | || 2550 || ½ || ½ || 0 || ½ || ½ || 0 ||  || ½ || ½ || ½ || ½ || ½ || 1 || 1 || 6½ || 2557 || 5–9
|-
| 8 || align="left" ||| 2615 || 0 || 0 || 1 || ½ || 0 || 1 || ½ ||  || 1 || ½ || 0 || ½ || 1 || ½ || 6½ || 2552 || 5–9
|-
| 9 || align="left" | || 2515 || 0 || 0 || ½ || ½ || ½ || 1 || ½ || 0 ||  || ½ || 1 || ½ || ½ || 1 || 6½ || 2560 || 5–9
|-
| 10 || align="left" | || 2560 || 0 || 0 || ½ || ½ || 1 || ½ || ½ || ½ || ½ ||  || ½ || ½ || ½ || ½ || 6 || 2528 || 10
|-
| 11 || align="left" | || 2480 || 0 || ½ || 0 || ½ || ½ || 1 || ½ || 1 || 0 || ½ ||  || 0 || ½ || ½ || 5½ || 2506 || 11
|- 
| 12 || align="left" | || 2565 || ½ || 0 || 0 || 0 || ½ || ½ || ½ || ½ || ½ || ½ || 1 ||  || 0 || ½ || 5 || 2469 || 12
|-
| 13 || align="left" | || 2445 || 0 || 0 || ½ || 0 || ½ || 0 || 0 || 0 || ½ || ½ || ½ || 1 ||  || ½ || 4 || 2424 || 13
|-
| 14 || align="left" | || 2475 || 0 || 0 || 0 || ½ || ½ || 0 || 0 || ½ || 0 || ½ || ½ || ½ || ½ ||  || 3½ || 2388 || 14
|}

References

Tata Steel Chess Tournament
1984 in chess
1984 in Dutch sport